Bregenzer Festspiele (Bregenz Festival) is a performing arts festival which is held every July and August in Bregenz in Vorarlberg (Austria).
It features a large floating stage which is situated on Lake Constance.

History 
The Festival became an international event in its first year 1946, one year after World War II. People from Germany, Switzerland and France came to the festival. Two stages were created out of floating barges. One barge for the Vienna Symphony Orchestra and the other barge for carrying stage structures.

The Vienna Symphony Orchestra is the biggest contributor to the Festival. This orchestra has a performance spot every year since the beginning of the festival. They have their own stage area and other venues used thorough out the festival. Every year the orchestra has a different conductor for each piece because it is considered the conductors performance. Kornmarktplatz, vorarlberg museum is the venture they are using for the 2016 Festival.

In 2001, the festival created a handful of contemporary arts events to go along with their usual performances. These events were a new collaboration with the Kunsthaus Bregenz that revolved around the theme of "America of the 20th century", and The Art of Our Times program, also known as KAZ, that brought together contemporary theatre with Workshop Theatre while collaborating with Hamburg's Thalia Theater. Other add-ons that the festival created for more variety and entertainment are the Children's Festival, the opera and band workshops, and family and school-group concerts.

From December 2003 until 2014, David Pountney has been the artistic director of the festival.

Over April and May 2008, scenes for the 22nd James Bond film Quantum of Solace were filmed on the Seebühne during a performance of Tosca and in June 2008 the German broadcasting corporation ZDF hosted its 2008 European Football Championship live broadcast studio on the floating stage.

In 2010, the festival offered about 100 performances that drew an audience of close to 200,000.

2015 was the first year for Elisabeth Sobotka as artistic director. She started with 80 events and by end of August 2015, further founded the Opera Studio with the goal "to help young singers with their professional and personal development in a highly professional environment and also to create a staging that the audience will really enjoy".

The season of year drew an audience of approx. 257,000. Carmen proved to be very popular and was mostly fully booked with a total audience number of 193,642 people, already including the dress rehearsal and crossculture night. In 2018, the Bregenz Festival broke its own record: With 270,000 visitors in only 5 weeks, the festival attained a new attendance record. It attracted 400,000 people in total when the programme featured Bizet's Carmen in 2017 and 2018.

The Bregenz Festival continues to show a series of popular Puccini works. La Bohème was the first Puccini performance in 2001/02, followed by Tosca in 2007/08 and most recently Turandot in 2015 and 2016, Madame Butterfly in 2021/22 will be the fourth opera by the Italian composer to be performed in Bregenz.

The festival offers guided tours from May to August.

The Bregenzer Festspiele had to cancel the 2020 festival due to the COVID-19 pandemic. The performances of Rigoletto and the opera Nero have been postponed to 2021.

Venues 
The festival presents a wide variety of musical and theatrical events in the following venues:

 Seebühne (or floating stage), with its 7,000 seat open-air amphitheatre, is the location for large-scale opera or musical performances on a stage over water on the shores of Lake Constance. 
Opera or musical productions on the floating stage generally tend to come from the popular operatic repertoire, but often are extravagantly original and innovative productions/ stagings, frequently using the waters of the lake as an extension of the stage. Recent productions have included Aida by Giuseppe Verdi in 2009 & 2010; Tosca by Giacomo Puccini in 2007–2008; Il trovatore by Giuseppe Verdi in 2005–2006; West Side Story by Leonard Bernstein in 2003-2004; La bohème by Giacomo Puccini in 2001–2002, and Ein Maskenball (Un ballo in maschera) by Giuseppe Verdi in 1999–2000.
 Festspielhaus presents performances of rarely performed opera and concerts. 
 Werkstattbühne presents performances of contemporary theatre and opera.
 Theater am Kornmarkt presents operetta and drama performances.
 shed8/Theater Kosmos venue for drama and crossculture performances.

Plays performed 
Throughout the seasons, the festival puts on many different performances; from operas to plays and orchestral pieces. The performances range in theme and story and many are performed in consecutive seasons. The full list of shows performed is as follows:

Facts and figures 

A visitor survey showed that the Lake Stage audience's origin is the following: 63 % Germany, 23 % Austria, 11 % Switzerland/Liechtenstein, 3 % other countries.(2019)

The Bregenzer Festspiele has the following seating capacities:

 Lake Stage: 6,980
 Festspielhaus, Great Hall: 1,656
 Workshop Theatre: 1,563
 Lake Foyer: 168
 Lake Studio: 330
 Park Studio: 220
 Vorarlberger Landestheater: 502
 Kunsthaus Bregenz: 150
 Theater Kosmos: 166

This adds up to a total of 11,735 seats.

See also
List of contemporary amphitheatres
List of opera festivals

Photo gallery

References

External links

 

Opera festivals
Bregenz
Music festivals established in 1946
1946 establishments in Austria
Music festivals in Austria
Festivals in Vorarlberg